Interim Resurgence is the fourth studio album by Zoogz Rift, released in 1985 by Snout Records.

Track listing

Personnel 
Adapted from the Ipecac liner notes.
 Zoogz Rift – vocals (A2-A4, A6, B2, B4), guitar (A1, A2, A5, B2), drum machine (A1), arrangement, conductor, production

Musicians
 Scott Colby – voice (A3)
 Tom Ferranti – drums (A2, A4, B2, B4)
 M.B. Gordy – drums (A6)
 Owen Green – bass guitar (A2, A4, B2, B4)
 Richie Hass – marimba (A6, B2, B4)
 Matt Karlsen – voice (A3)

Musicians (cont.)
 Marc Mylar – tenor saxophone (B2, B4), clarinet (B3), engineering
 Ed O'Bryan – voice (A3)
 Jonathan "Mako" Sharkey – voice (A3)
 John Trubee – voice (A3)
 Craig Unkrich – synthesizer (A2, A4, B2, B4), piano (B1), arrangement (B1)

Release history

References

External links 
 Interim Resurgence at iTunes
 

1985 albums
SST Records albums
Zoogz Rift albums